Lucrecia Dalt is a Colombian experimental musician who currently resides in Berlin. While her earlier releases were rooted in electronic dance music, her work has evolved over time to become more overtly abstract and experimental.

Biography
Dalt was born in Pereira, Colombia. She studied civil engineering and worked for two years in a geotechnical company in Medellin before deciding to pursue music.

Her first recordings were released by Colombian collective Series under the name Lucrecia. After meeting Gudrun Gut, she contributed four songs to the 4 Women No Cry compilation released on Monika Enterprise in 2008.

After moving to Europe she released a series of recordings, including a release on Nicolás Jaar's Other People imprint and a series of collaborations with Aaron Dilloway. Among her more recent releases are the albums Anticlines (2018), No Era Sólida (2020) and ¡Ay! (2022) on RVNG Intl.

In 2022 Dalt announced her debut film score for The Seed, a sci-film directed by Sam Walker.

British music magazine The Wire named ¡Ay! record of the year 2022.

Discography

As Lucrecia
Albums
 Acerca (Series, 2005)
 Congost (Pruna Recordings, 2009)

EPs
 Like Being Home (Series, 2007)

Compilation appearances
 4 Women No Cry Vol. 3 (Monika Enterprise, 2008)

As Lucrecia Dalt
Albums
 Commotus (Human Ear Music, 2012)
 Syzygy (Human Ear Music, 2013)
 Ou (Care Of Editions, 2015)
 Anticlines (RVNG Intl., 2018)
 No Era Sólida (RVNG Intl., 2020)
 ¡Ay! (RVNG Intl., 2022)

EPs
 Lucrecia Dalt (Other People, 2014)

With F.S.Blumm
 Curato Covers (La Bèl Netlabel, 2011)

With Aaron Dilloway
Albums
 Field Recordings In The Forest Of Colombia (self-released, 2020)
 Lucy and Aaron (Hanson, 2021)

Eps
 Dragon Loops (Deceptions Order bank, 2019)
 Demands of Ordinary Devotion (Hanson, 2021)
 The Blob (Hanson, 2021)

References

External links
 Futura artist page for Lucrecia Dalt

Experimental musicians
Colombian musicians
Living people
Year of birth missing (living people)
People from Pereira, Colombia